"You Got You" is an English song written and composed by Fijian singer and songwriter Elena Baravilala, this single was nominated at the 2016 Fiji Performing Rights Association Music Awards and also a hip hop version was produced and released by Elena Baravilala And DJ Ritendra featuring Fijian rapper J.Morrison.

Background
In an Interview released by Fiji Performing Rights Association, Elena Baravilala discuss the song as: "So it was a song that came out last year while I was going through certain circumstances, Being in the public eye, you are always expected to be inspirational and motivational and there is like a consistent pressure from the public on you all the time," Elena Baravilala also shared. "You have to be a certain person to always be the one providing the strength so a lot of the time people can carry on with your strength but they can’t carry your weakness, So at that very moment when you are looking for someone to carry both — your strengths and weaknesses — there was no one there and the only thing I had was the gift of music".

Track listing

Music video
The Official Music Video of "You Got You" was released on 12 March 2016, The Music Video was filmed and produced by HKAY Photography and it was Directed by Harry Cirimaiwasa and Epi Nasaroa and also Choreography by Jed Taylor.

Hip-hop version
The hip hop version of "You Got You" was released on 23 May 2016 by Elena Baravilala and DJ Ritendra under Lewavesi Production, this version of the track features hardcore raping by Fijian rapper J.Morrison.

Awards

Fiji Performing Rights Association Music Awards

References

External links
 You Got You Music Video.

2015 singles
2015 songs
Elena Baravilala songs
Songs written by Elena Baravilala